Kumaramputhur is a village in Palakkad district in the state of Kerala, India. It is administered, along with some other villages, by the Kumaramputhur gram panchayat. Palakkad - Kozhikode National highway passes through Kumaramputhur.

Demographics
 India census, Kumaramputhur had a population of 15,346 with 7,442 males and 7,904 females.

References

Villages in Palakkad district